A decade is a period of ten years.

Decade(s), Decad, Decadal or The Decade may also refer to:

Groups of ten
 Decad (Sumerian texts), a standard sequence of ten scribal training compositions
 Decade (log scale), a factor of 10 difference between two numbers
 Cosmological decade, a division of the lifetime of the cosmos
 Decade, in the French Republican calendar, a period of 10 days
 Decade, in the Braille writing system, a grouping of 10 characters 
 Decade, any of the repeated sequences of a rosary

Arts and entertainment

Games and toys
 Decade (Beanie Baby), a 2003 bear toy
 Decade (solitaire), a card game
 Guitar Hero On Tour: Decades, a 2008 video game

Music 
 Decad (chord) or decachord
 Decade (band), a British rock band 2009–2018

Albums
 A Decade, by Our Lady Peace, 2006
 Decade (Duran Duran album), 1989
 Decade (Neil Young album), 1977
 Decade (The Veer Union album), a studio album, 2016
 Decade (Acoustic Sessions), an EP by the Veer Union, 2016
 Decade: History of Our Evolution, a compilation album by the Veer Union, 2018
 Decade (Live at the El Mocambo), by Silverstein, 2010
 Decade 1994–2004, by AZ
 Decade: "...but wait it gets worse", by Sticky Fingaz, 2003
 Decade: Ten Years of Fierce Panda, 2004
 Decade, by Israel Houghton, 2012
 Decade, by Kerry Livgren, 1992
 Decade, by Rabbit in the Moon, 2007
 Decade, by Waltari, 1998
 Decade 1983–1993, by the Choirboys, 1993
 Decade 1998–2002 and Decade 2003–2007, by Dir En Grey, 2017
 Decade: Lift Up Your Eyes, by Planetshakers, 2005
 The Decade, an EP by Alesana, 2014
 Decades (David Palfreyman and Nicholas Pegg album), 2017
 Decades (Nightwish album), 2018
 Decades: World Tour, a concert tour by Nightwish, 2018
 Decades: Live in Buenos Aires, by Nightwish, 2019

Songs
 "Decades", by Joy Division from Closer, 1980
 "Decades", by Joe Walsh from Songs for a Dying Planet, 1992

Theatre and television
 Decade (play), a 2011 British play marking the tenth anniversary of the September 11 attacks
 Decades (TV network), an American television network
 Kamen Rider Decade, a 2009 Japanese tokusatsu series

Science
 Decadal survey, a report prioritizing specific goals of a scientific field for the coming decade
 Deep Earth Carbon Degassing Project (DECADE)

Sports
 The Decade, a professional wrestling stable 2013–2016
 Decade, a trick in Flatland BMX

See also
 10 years (disambiguation)
 Century (disambiguation) (a period of 100 years)